The 2008–09 ISU Junior Grand Prix was the 12th season of the ISU Junior Grand Prix, a series of international junior level competitions organized by the International Skating Union. It was the Junior-level complement to the 2008–09 ISU Grand Prix of Figure Skating, which was for Senior-level skaters. Skaters competed in the disciplines of men's singles, ladies' singles, pair skating, and ice dance.

Skaters earned points towards qualification at each of the eight Junior Grand Prix events. The top eight skaters/teams in the series from each discipline met at the Junior Grand Prix Final. For the first time, the Junior Grand Prix Final was held concurrently with the senior Grand Prix Final.

Competitions
The locations of the JGP events change yearly. In the 2008–09 season, the series was composed of the following events:

For the first time, the Junior Grand Prix Final was held in conjunction with the Grand Prix Final.

Qualifying
Skaters who reached the age of 13 by July 1, 2008 but had not turned 19 (singles and females of the other two disciplines) or 21 (male pair skaters and ice dancers) were eligible to compete on the junior circuit. Unlike the senior ISU Grand Prix of Figure Skating, skaters for the Junior Grand Prix are entered by their national federations rather than seeded by the ISU. The number of entries allotted to each ISU member federation is determined by their skaters' placements at the previous season's World Junior Figure Skating Championships in each respective discipline.

For the 2008–09 season, in singles, the five best placed member nations at the 2008 World Junior Figure Skating Championships were allowed to enter two skaters in all eight events. Member nations who placed sixth through tenth were allowed to enter one skater in all eight events. Member nations with a skater who had qualified for the free skate at Junior Worlds were allowed to enter one skater in seven of the events. Member nations who did not qualify for the free skate but placed 25th through 30th in the short program were allowed to enter one skater in six of the events. All other nations were allowed to enter one skater in five of the events. There were provisions for additional entries per member country if another country did not use all of its allotted entries.

In pairs, member nations were allowed to enter up to three teams per event. The host nation was allowed to enter as many pair teams as it wanted. Pairs was contested at four events out of eight.

In ice dance, member nations were allowed to enter one dance team per event. Member nations who placed in the top five at the 2008 World Junior Championships were allowed to enter a second dance team.

The host country was allowed to enter up to three skaters/teams in singles and dance in their event, and there was no limit to the number of pairs teams.

The general spots allowance for the 2008–09 Junior Grand Prix events was as follows:

All other member nations had one entry per discipline in five of the eight events in singles, and one entry in all eight events for ice dance.

Prize money
The total prize money for the Junior Grand Prix events in the 2008–2009 season was $22,500. Pairs and dance teams split the money. Everything is in US dollars. The breakdown is as follows:

The total prize money for the Junior Grand Prix Final in the 2008–2009 season was $105,000. Pairs and dance teams split the money. Everything is in US dollars. The breakdown is as follows:

Junior Grand Prix Final qualifiers
The following skaters have qualified for the 2008–2009 Junior Grand Prix Final, in order of qualification.

 Michal Březina, the second qualifier in the men's event, withdrew on December 1. Artur Gachinski, the first alternate, replaces him.
 Piper Gilles / Zachary Donohue, the fifth qualifiers in the ice dance event, withdrew due to an injury to Gilles. Marina Antipova / Artem Kudashev, the first alternates, replace them.
 Ekaterina Sheremetieva / Mikhail Kuznetsov, the first alternates in the pairs event, withdrew on December 1.

Medalists

Men

Ladies

Pairs

Ice dance

Medals table
The following is the table of total medals earned by each country on the 2008–2009 Junior Grand Prix. It can be sorted by country name, number of gold medals, number of silver medals, number of bronze medals, and total medals overall.

References

External links
 International Skating Union: ISU Junior Grand Prix
 Official Site: Junior Grand Prix Merano, Italy
 Official Site: Junior Grand Prix Madrid, Spain
 Official Site: Junior Grand Prix Sheffield, United Kingdom
 
 
 
 
 
 
 
 
 

ISU Junior Grand Prix
Junior Grand Prix
2008 in youth sport
2009 in youth sport